Elizabeth Kane, also known as Alice and Red Alice, is a fictional character created by Greg Rucka and J.H. Williams III. Beginning as a supervillain, she first appeared in August 2009 in the comic book Detective Comics, published by DC Comics. Her relationship with her twin sister Kate Kane defines much of Batwoman's emotional life. During The New 52, it is established that Kate and Beth are cousins of Bruce Wayne, the alter-ego of the superhero Batman, through his mother Martha Wayne (née-Kane).

Alice appears in the Arrowverse TV series Batwoman as part of the main cast, portrayed by Rachel Skarsten.

Fictional character biography
Alice's origin is told in flashback. Beth Kane is the identical twin sister of Kate Kane, and the daughter of Jacob Kane and his wife Gabrielle Kane, both career soldiers in the U.S. Army. The Kanes are Jewish, and Jacob Kane inherited vast wealth along with his other siblings. Bette Kane (the superheroine known as Flamebird, and later Hawkfire) is a cousin, and Bruce Wayne's mother Martha Kane Wayne was Jacob's sister.

Jacob Kane is promoted to colonel and assigned to NATO headquarters in Brussels, Belgium. When the twins turned 12 years old, their mother took them to a restaurant for a birthday dessert. A terrorist group (later revealed to be the organization known as the "Many Arms of Death") kidnapped the family, and Col. Kane led a rescue mission to save them. During the battle, Gabrielle was murdered by the terrorists. The terrorists kidnapped another young girl and murdered her too. Kate, seeing the body of a young girl under a blanket, is left with the impression her sister died. Col. Kane, however, knew that the terrorists had Beth. Despite looking for years, Col. Kane never found Beth. He never told Kate that Beth might still be alive. The Many Arms of Death needed twins to rule their organization, but since Kate Kane was rescued this meant Beth was not useful to them. Beth's fragile psyche led the Many Arms of Death to send her to the United States, where she was raised by the Religion of Crime.

15 Years later, Kate Kane becomes Batwoman.

First appearance

Alice makes her first appearance in 2009 in Detective Comics #854. With the death of Bruno Mannheim, the supervillain group known as the Religion of Crime is leaderless. The thirteen covens that make up the Religion of Crime elect Alice to lead the group, giving her the title "High Madame". Beth is shown to be insane, as she dresses in clothes and makeup to resemble the character Alice from Lewis Carroll novels and only speaks in quotations from the Alice novels. She kills a number of members of her own group when they fail her or question her abilities.

Alice kidnaps Col. Kane, who immediately recognizes his now-grown daughter, and uses him to gain access to a military base near Gotham City. She seizes chemical weapons from the base and intends to kill everyone in the city by dispersing them from an aircraft. During her final battle with Alice, Batwoman pushes her from the aircraft and Alice falls into Gotham Bay. Batwoman believes Alice to be dead.

The Gotham Police, however, never recover a body. Alice's final words implied that Col. Kane was her father. Taking Alice's blood spatters on her Batwoman costume, Kate Kane utilizes DNA testing to discover that Alice is her sister, Beth. The knowledge that her father hid Beth's possible survival from her led to a long rift in Kate and Jacob's relationship.

Reappearance
Alice reappears alive inside a sarcophagus in Batwoman (vol. 2) #17. According to Department of Extranormal Operations (DEO) Agent Cameron Chase, the Religion of Crime (ROC) was in the process of founding a cult based on Batwoman. The cult retrieved Beth's body from Gotham Harbor and placed it inside the sarcophagus. The sarcophagus brought Beth back to life, and kept her in suspended animation. Agent Chase, tasked by the DEO to discover the secret identity of Batwoman, uncovered the cult. All the cult members died defending the sarcophagus, which was brought back to DEO headquarters by Agent Chase. Scanning by DEO technicians revealed Beth was inside, and although she was apparently conscious the DEO did not open the sarcophagus for several months.

Now in the custody of the DEO, Beth appears traumatized by her months spent in the sarcophagus. Sometimes she's lucid, and other times reverts to her "Alice" personality. Mister Bones, director of the DEO, believes himself to be Jacob Kane's illegitimate son, and wants to use Beth for his own purposes. Batwoman agrees to uncover Batman secret identity if the DEO will turn Beth over to her, destroy all its files on the Kane family, stop targeting Bette Kane, stop putting pressure on Maggie Sawyer, and agree to no longer see Batwoman as one of their agents.

Thanks to Bette Kane's electronic listening devices, Batwoman's entire family and Maggie Sawyer realize what Batwoman is up against and how high the stakes are. Col. Kane sets up the "Murder of Crows", the elite group of ex-military and intelligence operatives who trained Kate, to provide backup support for Batwoman. The Crows and Hawkfire kidnap Agent Asaf, Mister Bones' top subordinate at the DEO, and induce him to reveal the location of Beth Kane in exchange for Batwoman's help in discrediting Bones (which will allow Asaf to take over the directorship of the DEO). Hawkfire and the Crows break into the DEO safe house and finds Beth, but are captured. Batwoman and Batman agree to work together to stop Bones and free Beth. Bones, whose body generates cyanide, threatens to kill Beth rather than hand her over. Asaf shoots Bones in the head and Beth is freed.

Col. Kane takes Beth to the Kane family's private island for psychiatric treatment.

Red Alice
In Batwoman (vol. 2) #36, Beth is depicted flying back to Gotham City, where she takes up residence in the mothballed family manor house on the Kane estate. She has returned to renew her relationship with Kate, having had a major breakthrough in her psychiatric treatment some weeks earlier (although she still speaks in quotations from Carroll at times). Clearly aware of Kate's superhero identity, she breaks into Kate's city apartment and reunites with Batwoman.

Calling herself Red Alice, Beth is introduced to Natalia Mitternacht (the vampire also known as Nocturna). Kate has abandoned her long-term relationship with Maggie Sawyer and formed one with Natalia. Beth instinctively realizes that Natalia is evil and has Kate under some sort of mental control. Beth says she wants to atone for the evil she did, and she shows familiarity with the steam-powered gun grappling hook Batwoman uses as well as incredible strength as she swings on filament lines above Gotham's city streets. When the witch Morgaine le Fey attacks an amnesiac Jason Blood in order to stop Etrigan the Demon from manifesting from Jason's body, Red Alice saves Jason from falling to his death. Red Alice later confronts Nocturna and accuses her of hypnotizing Kate. Nocturna has Batwoman attack Red Alice. Realizing she cannot defeat her sister physically, Beth offers her throat. The shock of almost being driven to kill the one person she loves more than anyone else allows Kate to break the hold Nocturna has on her. When Nocturna brags about the murders she's committed in Batwoman's name, Beth reveals that she's captured the admission on her mobile phone and live-streamed the admission to the Gotham Police Department. Afterward, Beth helps Kate deal with Natalia's emotional and sexual betrayal and successfully encourages her to reconcile with Maggie Sawyer.

Red Alice also participates in Batwoman's battle with Morgaine le Fey. Morgaine manages to recover a magical tool known as the "sorcerer's stone", which will enhance her powers dramatically. She intends to transform the world into a version of Avalon, which herself as empress. To do so, she and her demon horde ascend to a space station in outer space (the highest point above the planet). Red Alice accompanies Batwoman, Etrigan the Demon, Clayface, and Ragman aboard a Space Shuttle into orbit to stop Morgaine. The helmet of Alice's spacesuit cracks in battle, and Ragman saves her life by absorbing her soul into his costume. Batwoman's team is defeated by Morgaine, and they crash back to Earth. On a transformed Earth, Ragman restores Beth's soul to her body. The other evil souls trapped in Ragman's costume try to hold Beth back, but she resists them and screams that she wants to atone for all the wrong she has done. Red Alice then assists Batwoman's team in defeating le Fey and undoing the spell.

Reemergence of Alice
In a flashback in Batwoman (vol. 3) #7, Beth is depicted receiving further psychiatric treatment at the Weiße Kaninchen Sanatorium near Geneva, Switzerland.

The Alice persona reemerges in the "Many Arms of Death"/"Fall of the House of Kane" storyline. As depicted previously and during this story, Kate Kane comes out as a lesbian while obtaining her military education at the United States Military Academy. Depressed at the loss of her lover (who chose to keep her lesbianism a secret and remain in the Army) and her military career, Kate begins drinking heavily and taking drugs while traveling around the world and spending large sums of money. While sailing near the island of Coryana, she falls overboard and receives a severe head injury after striking a coral reef. The island's ruler, Safiyah Sohail, saves Kate's life by sewing Kate's skull shut with gold thread. The two become lovers, to the distress of Tahani, Safiyah's former partner. Coryana is a "pirate nation", providing tax havens, untraceable bank accounts, freedom of movement for arms dealers, and more, none of which worries Kate. Unwittingly, Kate becomes an asymptomatic carrier for a deadly bacterium found on the reefs on which she was injured; this bacterium causes a disease which ravages Coryana's fox population. To protect Kate, Safiyah scapegoats a troublesome man on the island, accusing him of releasing the plague, and has him killed. Kate is horrified and, after a brief fight with Safiyah and Tahani (now known by the codename "Knife"), leaves Coryana.

Years later, Batman asks Batwoman to help break the "Many Arms of Death", a terrorist organization. Batwoman learns that Beth is missing from the Weiße Kaninchen Sanatorium, and assumes Safiyah has her. Following a clue left by Safiyah, Batwoman travels to the long-abandoned Kane house in Brussels. Safiyah is there, but denies kidnapping Beth. She reveals that getting Batwoman to Belgium was a ruse to get her away from prying eyes and eavesdropping equipment. Safiyah reveals that Knife has betrayed them both, kidnapping Beth and using drugs to force her Alice personality to reemerge. Alice has subsequently taken over the Many Arms of Death, and plans to destroy Gotham City by unleashing thousands of deadly disease-carrying bats. Batwoman destroys the bats by trapping them in her airship and then initiating its self-destruction. Batwoman manages to further mitigate the damage of the attack with the help of her mission partner Julia Pennyworth, who synthesizes an aerosolized vaccine and disperses it over Gotham from the duo's secondary airship. As Batman (summoned by Julia) attempts to subdue Alice, Batwoman fights him off while arguing that Alice belongs with her and not in Arkham Asylum. She convinces him that family (Alice is Bruce Wayne's cousin, too) is more important. He allows her to keep control of Alice, although Batwoman's relationship with Batman becomes strained.

Three months after being rescued from Knife, Beth (sane once more now that the drugs are out of her system) is living with Kate in Kate's Gotham apartment. Somewhat psychologically and physically incapacitated by the drugs, she is cared for by Kate and Julia Pennyworth. The "Alice" persona is now theorized to be something magical implanted in Beth by the Religion of Crime, not induced by trauma. She receives outpatient therapy from a woman with a top hat (the comic implies this is the magical superheroine Zatanna).

In the story "Disinformation Campaign", part of the "Fear State" crossover storyline, Beth is still dealing with controlling her Alice persona. In order to discover information about Seer, an "Anti-Oracle" figure spreading misinformation throughout Gotham during the larger crisis, Beth works alongside her sister, disguising herself as Alice to infiltrate a gathering of the Religion of Crime in an attempt to recruit those followers to find Seer. Though this recruitment fails, the twins still identify the location of Seer; Kate relays this information to Nightwing and Oracle. During the mission, Beth has an interior conversation with her Alice persona, and comes to terms with keeping her under control and accepts that, for better or worse, Alice is now a part of her for good.

Batwoman: Future's End
Red Alice also appears in the comic book Batwoman: Future's End. Set five years into a potential future, Batwoman has become a vampire. Red Alice joins with Clayface, Jason Blood/Etrigan the Demon, and Ragman to try to stop her. During the battle, Batwoman kills Jason and Clayface. Red Alice fends off Batwoman's attacks using technology given to her by Bruce Wayne, and then reluctantly and tearfully kills her sister by driving a wooden stake through her heart.

Other appearances
Beth Kane appears several times in Batwoman stories in cameos and other minor roles.

 Batwoman dreams of the child Beth and the adult Alice after she injects herself with Scarecrow fear-toxin.
 When Batwoman is poisoned by the villain Wolf Spider, she hallucinates about Beth as a child and as Alice.
 Batwoman envisions a dead, skeletal Beth as she motivates herself to work harder at building her strength and fighting skills.
 Beth has a cameo in Batwoman's memories about her childhood at Kane Estate.
 While under the influence of Scarecrow's improved fear toxin, Batwoman has a hallucination in which the child Beth is killed by a warped version of the adult Alice. Beth appears in a flashback as Batwoman thinks about her family in an attempt to break the toxin's hold on her.
 A young Beth appears in one of Batwoman's memories about a time when Kate changed her Halloween costume to a mummy so Beth, despite having a broken wrist, would feel comfortable trick-or-treating.
 A young Beth appears in one of Batwoman's visions.

Description
Alice is 24 years of age when she makes her first appearance. She suffers from a psychosis in which she presents a personality based on the fictional Lewis Carroll character, Alice, and speaks in quotations from Alice novels and stories. She is depicted as having chalk-white skin, short and wavy blonde hair, red nails and lips, and using heavy black mascara and eye-liner. She dresses in white, pseudo-Victorian fashion with a low décolletage and dress cut away in front to expose her thigh-high stockings and garter. The Alice personality's speech balloons are black with white borders. The text is also white, as well as serif transitional, partly italicized, and in upper and lower case. This indicates her psychosis. The Beth personality's speech balloons are white with black, sans-serif, all-caps text. This is the same style used by all other characters in the comic, which represents her lucidity. Alice is usually armed with one or more handguns, sometimes carries sharp-edged weapons such as razor blades and knives, and has an acquired immunity to many poisons and chemical weapons. She has extensive knowledge of a wide range of chemicals, drugs, hallucinogens, and poisons.

Red Alice has a similar appearance to Alice, although the right side of her head is shaved. She dressed in roughly the same pseudo-Victorian costume (although without the long dress in the rear), but her clothing is now colored burgundy. Her makeup is also different. She now sports a spray-painted purplish-red domino mask around her eyes. Red Alice exhibits familiarity with a number of gadgets and weapons used by Batwoman, as well as the physical strength and dexterity needed to use them.

Under the influence of Tahani's drugs, Alice appears similar to the way she looked in her first appearance. She wears a simplified, tailored short dress with bodice and lace-up thigh boots. Her hair is no longer shaved on one side of her head, but she continues to paint her lips and nails red. To depict her insanity, her speech balloons are either black or deep red and outlined in white. She also no longer speaks in Lewis Carroll quotations.

In other media

Television

Alice appears in The CW superhero series Batwoman, portrayed by Rachel Skarsten while her younger-self is portrayed by Ava Sleeth. This version of Beth Kane was presumed dead after a car accident, but her body was never recovered. What really happened is that she was rescued from drowning and subsequently being held captive by August Cartwright who wants her to be a companion for his disfigured son Jonathan "Mouse" Cartwright. In addition, Jacob Kane's wife Catherine Hamilton-Kane used DNA analysts and the skull fragments of a deer to make Jacob think that Beth is dead. At a later date, she even received bad treatment from August's mother, Mabel who she referred to as the Queen of Hearts. After successfully escaping from August, Beth hid out on one of the ships and was briefly taken in by Safiyah Sohail. Growing up, she becomes Alice, forms the Wonderland Gang, and begins her revenge against her father for abandoning her. In the pilot episode, Alice meets her twin sister, Kate and quickly realizes that Alice is her twin sister during an event when crows operative Sophie Moore was abducted during a Bat-Signal shutdown event overseen by Mayor Michael Akins. Kate became Batwoman where she rescued Sophie and prevented the detonation of a bomb at a viewing event, but Alice got away. After giving a cryptic call to Jacob from his apartment at the time he was at a gala hosted by Tommy Elliot, she saves Batwoman by knocking out Tommy as she wanted her alive for now. Catherine later finds playing cards left by Alice in her bedroom and begs Jacob to deal with her despite his concerns that she might be Beth. Later, Alice crashed the gala where she put a poison that Hamilton Dynamics made into a champagne that Catherine and Mary drank. After Catherine died so that Mary can live, Alice fights Batwoman until Mouse tackled Batwoman enough for them to get away. After briefly visiting Mouse in ICU disguised as Crows agent, Alice learned about another Beth on Earth-Prime where their existence causes them to have migraines. While Kate was able to give Mary's blood to the alternate Beth and lingers by a trapped Alice, the alternate Beth is sniped enabling Alice to feel better and knock out Kate. After catching August who had been disguised as Dr. Ethan Campbell all this time, Alice left him for Kate who confessed to Kate and Jacob about what he did. Jacob later rescued Alice from a fear gas trap that Mouse put her in. When incarcerated at Arkham Asylum, Alice and Mouse formed an alliance with Tommy Elliot and turned him into Hush. After she obtained Lucius Fox's coded journal and the glasses that decodes them, Alice plans to procure some Kryptonite that would pierce the Batsuit. While putting Mouse out of his misery, Alice also makes Hush a new face that resembles the face of Bruce Wayne.
Skarsten also plays Earth-99's Beth in the Arrowverse crossover event "Crisis on Infinite Earths". She appears in a photo with Earth-99's Kate where they didn't get separated in the car accident.
Kate later encounters a similar Beth (also portrayed by Skarsten) on Earth-Prime, displaced from her now non-existent reality, where she is shocked to learn of her doppelganger's villainy and even briefly assumes Alice's identity in an attempt to save Kate. After Mouse ends up in Crows custody under heavy guard in their ICU, Alice and the alternate Beth start to develop severe headaches. This Beth reveals she was not separated from her family and later went on to get a master's degree in astrophysics. This Beth was later sniped and killed by August Cartwright who mistook her for Alice.

Film
Beth Kane makes a cameo in Batman: Bad Blood. She is seen in a flashback detailing Batwoman's backstory. This version has had no indication of survival or subsequent psychosis.

Notes

References

External links
 

Batwoman
Characters created by Greg Rucka
Chemical war and weapons in popular culture
Comics characters introduced in 2009
DC Comics female supervillains
DC Comics television characters
Female characters in television
Fictional American Jews in comics
Fictional characters with neurological or psychological disorders
Fictional chemists
Fictional crime bosses
Fictional identical twins
Twin characters in comics
Fictional mass murderers
Fictional rampage and spree killers
Jewish superheroes
Superhero television characters
Batman characters